Gallowitsch is a German surname. It may refer to:

Bernd Gallowitsch (1918–1983), Luftwaffe ace
Gunter Gallowitsch (born 1944 in Graz), Austrian diplomat, mission chief in Manilla (1990–1994)

Gallowitsch metal firm
In 1852 Joseph Gallowitsch received an Austrian privilege regarding a metal forming machine used in the precious metals plaque industry. His firm was based in Graz. Between 1869 and 1874 Ignaz Gallowitsch and Joseph Essi held an Austrian privilege regarding metal cuts used in shoes.

See also
Galowych

References